Janie Wilkinson Whyte (1869–1953) was an Australian artist.

Biography 

Whyte was a painter, etcher, and wood-carver who studied at the National Gallery School from 1890–1895 and together with Dora Wilson and Jessie Traill took lessons in etching from John Mather. Their etchings were published in The Lone Hand in 1907 as some of the earliest works in this field made by women. Whyte was an impressionist artist who painted portraits, figure studies, and landscapes, and was one of the first Melbourne women to paint dockyard scenes. She also painted interiors and flowers, and worked with oils, watercolours, and pastels. Her cityscapes contained charming observations of Melbourne life.

As part of a first wave of feminist artists in Melbourne, Whyte presented a paper at women's cultural group the Austral Salon along with Violet Teague in August 1907. While a copy of her lecture was not archived it is said she discussed the struggle for Australian women artists to get recognition.

References

External links
Janie Wilkinson Whyte Australian art and artists file, State Library Victoria
Janie Wilkinson Whyte : work old and new (Athenaeum, Sept 17–28, 1935) digitised item, State Library Victoria

Australian artists
1869 births
1953 deaths